The Vipos tuco-tuco (Ctenomys viperinus) is a species of rodent in the family Ctenomyidae. It is endemic to northern Tucumán Province in northern Argentina. The common name is a reference to the city of Vipos in the area.

References

Mammals of Argentina
Tuco-tucos
Endemic fauna of Argentina
Mammals described in 1926
Taxa named by Oldfield Thomas